Sânmartin (Hungarian pronunciation: , meaning "St. Martin of Csík") is a commune in Harghita County, Romania. It lies in Székely Land, an ethno-cultural region in eastern Transylvania.

Component villages 
The commune is composed of three villages:

Cozmeni (Csíkkozmás) along with the village of Lăzărești (Lázárfalva) have formed an independent commune since 2002.

History 
The villages belonged to the Székely seat of Csíkszék until the administrative reform of Transylvania in 1876, when they fell within Csík County in the Kingdom of Hungary. After the Treaty of Trianon of 1920, they became part of Romania and fell within Ciuc County during the interwar period. In 1940, the second Vienna Award granted the Northern Transylvania to Hungary and the villages were held by Hungary until 1944. After Soviet occupation, the Romanian administration returned and the commune became officially part of Romania in 1947. Between 1952 and 1960, the commune fell within the Magyar Autonomous Region, between 1960 and 1968 the Mureș-Magyar Autonomous Region. In 1968, the province was abolished, and since then, the commune has been part of Harghita County.

Demographics
The commune has an absolute Hungarian Székely majority. According to the 2011 census it has a population of 2,308 which 98,83% or 2,281 are Hungarian.

Economy 
The size of the arable land is 1,109 ha, of which 526 ha are cultivated by the agricultural company Burgabotek MT. Pasture of an area of 474 ha belong to the commonages 'Csekefalva' and 'Aklós'. 1295 ha of reaper is owned by individual farmers. The area of forest is 1162 ha, of which 8 ha belong to individuals while the remaining parts belong to commonages.

Potato, grain - wheat, barley, rye - and sugar beet is grown by individual farmers and an agricultural association. Fodder is produced in private businesses, likewise, stock breeding is dealt with by individual farmers, cattle, swine, sheep, goats being kept in the village. 

The most important branch of industrial activity is timber-industry, including logging and processing. Currently, four sawmills operate in the village and the production is exported to several European countries. The sawmills provide more than 100 jobs for locals.

Twinnings
The commune is twinned with:
  Kenderes, Hungary
   Mórahalom, Hungary
   Zalahaláp, Hungary
  Sülysáp, Hungary

External links 
Touristic website

References

Communes in Harghita County
Localities in Transylvania
Székely communities